Cryptolechia gypsochra is a moth in the family Depressariidae. It was described by Edward Meyrick in 1938. It is found in Yunnan, China.

References

Moths described in 1938
Cryptolechia (moth)
Taxa named by Edward Meyrick